José María Cordovez Moure (1835–1918) was a Colombian writer and historian. He was born in Popayán in Cauca into a large family. Following the bankruptcy of his father, the family moved to Bogotá in 1838. Cordovez Mouro studied in several schools and colleges; he entered the National University in 1849 in order to study philosophy, but the following year his studies were interrupted thanks to disturbances on campus. He eventually studied law at the Colegio Mayor de Nuestra Señora del Rosario.

The economic difficulties of his family forced him into work early on, especially because he was the only son out of 12 children. From his youth, he was obliged to work in several different professions. In 1862, he began his career as a government employee, which would last nearly 50 years. He was variously administrator of the salt mines of Chita, railroad inspector, diplomat in foreign consulates, undersecretary to cabinet ministers, etc. He was also trustee of the Hospital de San Juan de Dios y del Buen Pastor, and consul general of Chile in Bogotá. Although he had written from an early age, it was only at the age of fifty-six that he truly dedicated himself to letters. In 1891 he started work at El Telegrama, continuing until his death.

In spite of his obligations as a public official, Cordovez Moure was a regular at literary gatherings in Bogota. He was part of the group of intellectuals and writers who belonged to the costumbrista school of El Mosaico, a literary movement that lasted from 1858 to 1870. His Reminiscences of Bogota, made up of eight volumes, are his most famous work. In this series, Cordovez Moure painstakingly portrayed the Bogota of his time. Among his other publications are Recuerdos autobiográficos, Un viaje a Roma and De la vida de antaño.

References

Colombian writers